Tengger Cavalry was a heavy metal band originated from Inner Mongolia and Beijing and formerly based in New York state and Texas. They combine elements of the traditional music of Central Asia and music of Mongolia with heavy metal into a kind of folk metal that Billboard and CNN refer to as nomadic folk metal.

The band also recorded game soundtracks for Civilization 6 and Doom Eternal.

History 
Tengger Cavalry was founded in March 2010 as one-man project by Nature Ganganbaigal. The band is named after the ancient Mongolian and Turkic deity Tengri.

The first international review of their debut demo album Blood Sacrifice Shaman by German heavy metal magazine Legacy in 2011 was cautiously optimistic about the band's potential. Later MTV did an interview with the band.

In 2012, a feature by UK magazine Terrorizer gave the band a wider international audience.
Meanwhile, another UK magazine Metal Hammer commented on their music.

In 2014, Tengger Cavalry released their third album. Metal Hammer was again drawn to the new album.

In October 2015, CNN did a video interview with the band. On December 24, the group's debut concert at Carnegie Hall was featured in Noisey, The Village Voice, Loudwire and The New York Times.

On February 27, 2018, it was announced the band had broken up. Less than five months following the breakup, Nature G announced the band was back together.

On June 24, 2019, Tengger Cavalry announced frontman Nature Ganganbaigal died of undisclosed causes.

Band members

Final lineup
 Patrick Reilly - lead guitar (2018–2019)
 Randy Tesser - drums (2018–2019)
 Greg Baker - bass, double bass (2018–2019)
 Tamir Hargana - horsehead fiddle, Tuvan throat singing (2018-2019)

Former
 Nature G - rhythm guitar, throat singing, morin khuur; all instruments (2010–2019; died 2019)
 Yuri Liak - drums (2015)
 Alex Abayev - bass (2015–2018)
 Josh Schifris - drums (2016–2017)
 Zaki Ali - drums (2017–2018)
 Robert McLaughlin - igil, shanz, throat singing (2015)
 Borjigin Chineeleg - throat singing, topshur, jawharp (2017–2018)
 Uljmuren De - morin khuur (2016–2018)
 Phillip Newton - topshur, backing vocals (2017–2018)

Awards 
 "Mountain Side" - 2016 Global Music Awards - silver (music video category)
 "Independence Day" - 2017 The Academia Music Awards, Best Heavy Metal Song

Discography

Studio albums 
 Blood Sacrifice Shaman (2010)
Cavalry Folk (2011)
 Sunesu Cavalry (2012)
 Blood Sacrifice Shaman (2015)
 Cavalry in Thousands (2016)
 Ancient Call (2016)
 Die on My Ride (2017)
 Cian Bi (2018)
 Northern Memory (2019)

Remix 
 Grassland Rock(2016)
 Soundtrack of the Cavalry(2016)

EPs 
 KAAN(2016)
 Mountain Side(2016)

Singles 
 "War Horse" (2018)
 "A Blade of Time"
"Heart" (2016)

Videography 
 "Independence Day"
 "KAAN"
 "War Horse"
 "Mountain Side"

References 

Mongolian heavy metal musical groups
Chinese folk metal musical groups
2010 establishments in China
2019 disestablishments in China
Central Asian music